Dromaeschna weiskei is a species of dragonfly in the family Telephlebiidae, known as an ochre-tipped darner. It inhabits streams in coastal rainforests of north-eastern Queensland, Australia.

Dromaeschna weiskei is a large black dragonfly with pale green markings and an orange-red tip to its tail.

Gallery

See also
 List of dragonflies of Australia

References

Telephlebiidae
Odonata of Australia
Endemic fauna of Australia
Taxa named by Friedrich Förster
Insects described in 1908